Marcel Dumoulin (17 January 1905 – 30 June 1981) was a French weightlifter. He competed in the 1928 Summer Olympics, in the 1932 Summer Olympics, and in the 1936 Summer Olympics.

Career
Dumoulin was born in Strasbourg. In 1928 he finished tenth in the heavyweight class. Four years later he finished fourth in the heavyweight class at the 1932 Games. At the 1936 Olympics, he finished again tenth in the heavyweight class.

References

External links
 
Marcel Dumoulin's profile at Sports Reference.com
Brief biography of Marcel Dumoulin 

1905 births
1981 deaths
French male weightlifters
Olympic weightlifters of France
Weightlifters at the 1928 Summer Olympics
Weightlifters at the 1932 Summer Olympics
Weightlifters at the 1936 Summer Olympics
20th-century French people